Lady Lucy Whitmore (Bridgeman; 22 January 1792 – 17 March 1840) was an English noblewoman and a hymn writer.

Biography
Lucy Elizabeth Georgiana Bridgeman was born on 22 January 1792. She was the only daughter of Orlando Bridgeman, 1st Earl of Bradford. Her mother was Lucy Elizabeth Byng (1760–1844), the eldest daughter of George Byng, 4th Viscount Torrington. She had four siblings, all brothers, namely: George Bridgeman, 2nd Earl of Bradford; Vice-Admiral the Hon. Charles Orlando Bridgeman; Hon. Orlando Henry Bridgeman; and Reverend Hon. Henry Edmund Bridgeman.

On 29 January 1810, she married William Wolryche-Whitmore, of Dudmaston Hall, Shropshire. She published, Family prayers for every day in the week : selected from various portions of the Holy Bible with references. To which are added, a few prayers for persons in private ; and fourteen original hymns in 1824, containing the lyrics to fourteen original hymns with a second edition in 1827. Number eight of these hymns was "Father, again in Jesus' name we meet", and it passed into many collections. Suitable for Lent, this hymn appeared to be the only one known or used towards the end of the 19th-century.

Whitmore was a friend of Lady Louisa Cadogan.

Lady Lucy Whitmore died on 17 March 1840 and was buried at Quatt.

"Father, again in Jesus' name we meet"

Selected works
 Family prayers for every day in the week : selected from various portions of the Holy Bible with references. To which are added, a few prayers for persons in private ; and fourteen original hymns, 1824
 Sunday reading for very little boys and girls, 1832
 Morning and evening prayers, 1869

References

Bibliography

External links
 

1792 births
1840 deaths
Lucy
English hymnwriters
19th-century English writers
19th-century English women
19th-century British women writers
British women hymnwriters
Daughters of British earls
19th-century British women musicians